Piet Peters (born 28 September 1921, date of death unknown) was a Dutch cyclist. He competed in the individual and team road race events at the 1948 Summer Olympics.

See also
 List of Dutch Olympic cyclists

References

External links
 

1921 births
Year of death missing
Dutch male cyclists
Olympic cyclists of the Netherlands
Cyclists at the 1948 Summer Olympics
Sportspeople from Haarlem
Cyclists from North Holland